{{DISPLAYTITLE:C5H4N4S}}
The molecular formula C5H4N4S (molar mass : 152.18 g/mol) may refer to :
 Mercaptopurine, an immunosuppressive drug
 Tisopurine, a treatment of gout

References

Molecular formulas